Andy Frost is an automotive mechanic, speed enthusiast, international drag racer and owner of the Red Victor 2. He was born in Birmingham, England on July 4, 1961.

Career
Frost has won multiple awards (race), including the 1996 street eliminator series. He was runner up for the same prize in 2006 and 2007. He was also the co-creator of the World Street Race  along with Trish Biro. He is a transmission specialist by trade.

Red Victor

The 'Red Victor 2' is Andy Frost's ongoing project car. In a video on YouTube.com he estimates over £100,000 or around $200,000 Canadian of work has been done to the 1972 Vauxhall Victor. Included in the parts added is a twin-turbo 9.3 liter engine and a custom-built transmission designed by Frost and Penn Auto. The vehicle is "as aerodynamic as a brick" but is capable of reaching  on the track with the help of the  power plant and a long list of modifications. Andy originally purchased the car for only £60 in 1981.
He is now driving the Red Victor 3 which is the former world's quickest and fastest street-legal car in the 1/4 mile.

On September 13, 2014 during Hot Rod Magazine's Drag Week Larry Larson took the world record street-legal ET with a time of 6.163, but didn't beat the 230-mph record. Then was later exceeded farther with a 5:95 1/4 mile at 244 mph.

References

 YouTube.com

External Reading
 Official Red Victor Website

Living people
1961 births
British racing drivers